Toguz korgool or togyzkumalak, is a two-player game in the mancala family that is played in Central Asia.

Board 
The game is played on a board with two rows of nine holes. There are two "kazna"  between these rows, which are used to collect captured stones of each user, separately. At the beginning there are nine stones in each hole, except the kazna, which are empty, so players need a total of 162 stones.

Game start 

The board sides are labeled as black and white. The player sitting on the white side starts the game.

Game play 

Players move alternately. A move consists of taking stones from a hole and distributing them to other holes. On his/her turn, a player takes all the stones of one of his holes, which is not a tuz (see below), and distributes them anticlockwise, one by one, into the following holes. The first stone must be dropped into the hole which was just emptied. However, if the move began from a hole which contained only one stone, this stone is put into the next hole.

If the last stone falls into a hole on the opponent's side, and this hole then contains an even number of stones, these stones are captured and stored in the player's kazna. If the last stone falls into a hole of the opponent, which then has three stones, the hole is marked as a "tuz" ("salt" in Kyrgyz). 
There are a few restrictions on creating a tuz:
 A player may create only one tuz in each game.
 The last hole of the opponent (his ninth or rightmost hole) cannot be turned into a tuz.
 A tuz cannot be made if it is symmetrical to the opponent's one (for instance, if the opponent's third hole is a tuz, you cannot turn your third hole into one). It is permitted to make such a move, but it wouldn't create a tuz.

The stones that fall into a tuz are captured by its owner. He may transfer its contents at any time to his kazna. The game ends when a player can't move at his turn because all the holes on his side, which are not tuz, are empty.

When the game is over, the remaining stones which are not yet in a kazna or in a tuz are won by the player on whose side they are. The winner is the player who, at the end of the game, has captured more stones in their tuz and their kazna. When each player has 81 stones, the game is a draw.

Competitions

The first Togyzmkumalak World Championship was held on November 1-7, 2010 in Astana, Kazakhstan. The 25 participants of the men's championship represented 14 nations: Antigua and Barbuda, China, Germany, Georgia, Kazakhstan, Kyrgyzstan, Mongolia, Russia, Spain, Switzerland, Turkey, Turkmenistan, USA, and Uzbekistan. The 18 players of the women's championship came from 10 countries: Azerbaijan, China, Czech Republic, Kazakhstan, Kyrgyzstan, Mongolia, Russia, Turkey, Turkmenistan, and Uzbekistan. Four nations sent full teams (3 players) in each gender: Kazakhstan, Kyrgyzstan, Mongolia and Russia. Uzbekistan had a full male team. Similar to chess, Go and checkers, there are world championships which attract players from all over the world. The Toguz Korgool Federation was found in Bishkek, Kyrgyz Republic, in 1993. The Togyzkumalak World Championships are held every two years, the last ones were in Pardubice, Czech Republic, in 2012. The current Togyzkumalak / Toguz Korgool World Champions are Asel Dalieva (women) and Nurbek Kabiyev (men). The best non-Asian player was Jurij Nold (Germany). There are many competitions on local, regional and national levels in Central Asia. In addition, there are annual tournaments in some European countries, including England (London), Germany (Schweinfurt), Switzerland (La Tour-de-Peilz), and the Czech Republic (Prague and Pardubice). Toguz korgool is now also included in the program of the World Nomad Games.

The game is considered a national sport in Kyrgyzstan and Kazakhstan. It is estimated that there are about 10,000 organized players and about 200 official trainers in Kazakhstan alone.

References

Akshorayev, A. Toguz Kumalak: Kodeks i Klassifizirovanje Igri. Mektep, Alma-Ata (Soviet Union) 1980.
Machatscheck, H.  Zug um Zug: Die Zauberwelt der Brettspiele. Verlag Neues Leben, Berlin (Germany / GDR) 1972, 146-147.
Machatscheck, H.  Stein um Stein: Exotik der Brettspiele. Verlag Neues Leben, Berlin (Germany / GDR) 1984, 69 & 76-84.
 Pantusov, N. N. Kirgiskaya Igra Toguz Kumalak. In: Izvestia Obshchestva Arkheoligij, Istorij, i Etnografij pri Kazanskom Universitete (Kazan, Russia) 1906; 22: 249-252.
Sharipov, C. A. & Seitshanov, A. M. Laws of Toguz Kumalak Game. Ministry of Tourism and Sports of the Republic of Kazakhstan, Committee of Sports Affairs, Astana (Kazakhstan) 2006.
Shotayev, M. Rules of Intellectual Game: Toguz Kumalak. Turkistan (Kazakhstan) 2005.

External links 
Алгебра кочевников (Toguz korgool) Android Apps on Google Play (in Russian, Kyrgyz and English)
Toguz korgool Android Apps on Google Play (in Russian)
Toguz korgool site
Toguz korgool in Poland
The Kazakh Toguz Kumalak Federation (in Kazakh)
A web site, where you can play Toguz kumalak online
Game application for Android-devices in Google Play (author: Yernar Shambayev)
PlayOK Toguz kumalak online

Traditional mancala games
Traditional board games